Crepidodera peloponnesiaca is a species of flea beetle from the Chrysomelidae family that is endemic to Greece.

References

Beetles described in 1910
Beetles of Europe
Alticini